The men's 400 metres event at the 2019 European Athletics Indoor Championships was held on 1 March 2019 at 10:20 (heats), at 21:00 (semifinals) and on 2 March 2019 at 20:22 (final) local time.

Medalists

Records

Results

Heats

Qualification: First 2 in each heat (Q) and the next 4 fastest (q) advance to the Semifinal.

Semifinals

Qualification: First 2 in each heat (Q) and the next 2 fastest (q) advance to the Final.

Final

References

2019 European Athletics Indoor Championships
400 metres at the European Athletics Indoor Championships